George Newman (ca. 1562 – 7 June 1627), of Canterbury, Kent, was an English politician.

He was a Member of Parliament (MP) for Dover in 1601 and Canterbury in 1614 and 1621.

In March 1602 Newman was appointed judge of the Admiralty court of the Ports by Henry Brooke, warden of the Cinque Ports.

References

1560s births
1627 deaths
16th-century English people
Members of the Parliament of England for Dover
English MPs 1601
English MPs 1614
English MPs 1621–1622